Robert Williams (1837–unknown) was an American sailor and recipient of the Medal of Honor during the American Civil War. Little is known about Williams except for information regarding his Medal of Honor action.

Williams has been listed as "Lost to History" by the Medal of Honor Historical Society of the United States because his burial location is unknown.

Medal of Honor citation

References 

1837 births
American Civil War recipients of the Medal of Honor
Year of death missing